Bastan is a rural locality (a selo) and the administrative center of Bastansky Selsoviet of Mikhaylovsky District, Altai Krai, Russia. The population was 903 in 2016. There are 8 streets.

Geography 
Bastan is located 19 km west of Mikhaylovskoye (the district's administrative centre) by road. Nikolayevka is the nearest rural locality.

References 

Rural localities in Mikhaylovsky District, Altai Krai